Yvan Roy (born 26 February 1944) is a French former professional football player and manager. As a player, he was a forward.

Honours 
Sedan
 Coupe de France runner-up: 1964–65
 Coupe Charles Drago runner-up: 1962–63

Angers
 Division 2: 1968–69

France Military

 World Military Cup: 1964

Notes

References 

1944 births
Living people
Footballers from Caen
French footballers
Association football forwards
Stade Malherbe Caen players
CS Sedan Ardennes players
Angers SCO players
RC Strasbourg Alsace players
FC Sochaux-Montbéliard players
Ligue 1 players
Ligue 2 players
France amateur international footballers
France youth international footballers
France under-21 international footballers
France B international footballers
French football managers
CS Sedan Ardennes managers
French Division 3 (1971–1993) managers